Bellmont High School is a public high school located in Decatur, Indiana, United States. It was founded in 1967.

Bellmont is a member of the North Central Association of Colleges and Schools and is rated as a comprehensive high school by the Indiana Department of Education. The school offers many subjects, numerous clubs, and several varsity athletic teams. The boys' athletics teams are known as the Braves, and the girls' teams are called the Squaws.

History 

Bellmont High School has been in existence since 1967. It is a consolidation of Decatur Catholic High School, Monmouth High School, and Decatur High School. It was originally located between 3rd and 4th Streets and Jefferson Street. Two years later, the school moved to its current location at 1000 North Adams Drive on the site of the former Bellmont Park. Since that time, the building has been expanded a number of times to include improvements to the expansion of the athletic complexes and the widening curriculum. Bellmont has two gymnasiums as well as facilities for all varsity sports. Bellmont also has a band and arts program. The theatre seats 820.

Athletics 
Bellmont competes in the Northeast Eight Conference and offers a variety of competitive sports teams, including baseball, basketball, cheerleading, cross country, football, golf, soccer, softball, swimming, tennis, track, volleyball, and wrestling.

The school wrestling team won state titles in 1987, 1988, 1994. The football team won the 3A state championship in 2008 and the volleyball team won state in 2007 and 2010.

See also
 List of high schools in Indiana

References

External links 
 

Educational institutions established in 1967
Public high schools in Indiana
Schools in Adams County, Indiana
1967 establishments in Indiana